Al-Wathiq I, (died after 1341) was the fourth Abbasid caliph seated in Cairo under the Mamluk Sultanate between 1340 and 1341.

Life 

His grandfather al-Hakim I was preoccupied with playing, and he turned to the friendship of the erals, so he changed his mind and entrusted to his son Abu Rabee Suleiman, who spoke about him. Abu Rabee Suleiman took the order and was named as al-Mustakfi I. Ibn Qalawun, and this led to the split between the two after they were like brothers and catch the Sultan of the Caliph al-Mustakfi and his family and his family to Qus, where he remained until he died in 740 AH and was entrusted before his death to his son Ahmed. As for Sultan al-Nasir Ahmad ibn Qalawun, the Caliph denied this allegiance to Ibrahim in the name of the believer in God. He did not look at the era of the Muqtafi. When the death came, he regretted what he did. Al-Nasir Muhammad ibn Qalawun died in Dhu al-Hijjah in 1344 (741 AH) after he recommended the abdication of the caliph.

References

Bibliography

1341 deaths
14th-century Abbasid caliphs
Year of birth unknown